Wendell Bowman may refer to:

Wendell P. Bowman (1847–1928), major general in the Pennsylvania National Guard
Wink Bowman, Wendell "Wink" Bowman (1916–2001), American basketball player